The Kingdom of Sikkim (Classical Tibetan and , Drenjong), officially Dremoshong (Classical Tibetan and ) until the 1800s, was a hereditary monarchy in the Eastern Himalayas which existed from 1642 to 16 May 1975, when it merged with the Republic of India. It was ruled by Chogyals of the Namgyal dynasty.

History

Nepalese-Bhutanese domination
In the mid-18th century, Sikkim was invaded by both Nepal (then the Gorkha Kingdom) and Bhutan (then ruled by Gedun Chomphel) and was under both the Gorkha and the Bhutanese rule for more than 40 years. Between 1775 and 1815, almost 180,000 ethnic Nepalis from Eastern and Central Nepal migrated to Sikkim. After the British colonisation of India, however, Sikkim allied itself with British India as they had a common enemy – Nepal. The infuriated Nepalese attacked Sikkim with vengeance, overrunning most of the region including the Terai. This prompted the British East India Company to attack Nepal in 1814, resulting in the Anglo-Nepalese War. The Sugauli Treaty between Britain and Nepal and the Treaty of Titalia between Sikkim and British India resulted in territorial concessions by Nepal, which ceded Sikkim to British India.

British and Indian protectorate

Under the 1861 Treaty of Tumlong, Sikkim became a British protectorate, then an Indian protectorate in 1950.

Thutob Namgyal, the 9th Chogyal of Sikkim, looked to the Dalai Lama for spiritual leadership and during his reign the Tibetan government started to regain political influence over Sikkim. In 1888 the British sent a military expedition to expel Tibetan forces from Sikkim.

Accession to India

In 1975, allegations of discrimination against Nepali Hindus in Sikkim led to resentment against the Chogyal. Their instigation led to Indian Army personnel moving into Gangtok. According to Sunanda K. Datta-Ray of The Statesman, the army killed the palace guards and surrounded the palace in April 1975.

After disarming the palace, a referendum on the monarchy was held, in which the Sikkimese people overwhelmingly voted to abolish the monarchy, and the new parliament of Sikkim, led by Kazi Lhendup Dorjee, proposed a bill for Sikkim to become an Indian state, which was promptly accepted by the Government of India.

Culture and religion
In culture and religion, Sikkim was linked closely with Tibet, from which its first king migrated, and Bhutan, with which it shares borders. The presence of a large ethnic Nepali population, mainly from eastern and central Nepal, also leads to cultural linkages with Nepal.

See also 
 Sikkim
 History of Sikkim
 Chogyal
 List of heads of government of the Kingdom of Sikkim
 List of political officers in the Kingdom of Sikkim

References

Citations

Sources

Further reading

External links 
 "Buddhist Monasteries of Sikkim". Sikkim.nic.in.
 
 Climbing the clouds to Sikkim
 Kings of Sikkim
 The Sikkim saga, through an American lens

 
Sikkim
States and territories established in 1642
States and territories disestablished in 1975
Sikkim, Kingdom of
Sikkim, Kingdom of
Sikkim, Kingdom of
Sikkim, Kingdom of
Tibetan Buddhist places
Associated states
Sikkim, Kingdom of
1642 establishments in Asia
1975 disestablishments in Asia
Sikkim, Kingdom of